Ingeniero Adolfo Sourdeaux (commonly known as Adolfo Sourdeaux) is a town in Malvinas Argentinas Partido of Buenos Aires Province, Argentina. It is located in the north west of the Greater Buenos Aires urban agglomeration.

Name 

The town is named after French engineer Adolfo Sourdeaux who arrived in Argentina in 1845.

External links

 Municipal website map

Populated places in Buenos Aires Province
Malvinas Argentinas Partido